Taybad County is in Razavi Khorasan province, Iran. The capital of the county is the city of Taybad. At the 2006 census, the county's population was 143,205, in 31,291 households. The following census in 2011 counted 108,424 people in 26,673 households, by which time Bakharz District had been separated from the county to form Bakharz County. At the 2016 census, the county's population was 117,564 in 30,718 households.

Administrative divisions

The population history and structural changes of Taybad County's administrative divisions over three consecutive censuses are shown in the following table. The latest census shows two districts, four rural districts, and three cities.

References

 

Counties of Razavi Khorasan Province